St James' Church, Forest Gate was a church in Forest Gate, east London. Its origins lay in an iron building constructed around 1870 to serve a conventional district. A parish was formed for it in 1881 from those of Emmanuel Church, All Saints and St John's and its permanent church completed the following year, with an organ moved from St Matthew's Church, Friday Street. The church was demolished in 1964 and for two years its congregation worshiped in the Durning Hall Community Centre's chapel until the parish was merged with that of St John's. A new church was built for the St James' congregation at northern end of St James Road in 1968. The congregation finally moved to St Paul's Church, Stratford in 2014, though the area that had formerly been St James' parish was instead transferred from St John's to St Saviour's the same year.

Football team

A football club, St James' (Forest Gate), possibly a church side, entered the FA Cup in 1885–86.  The club scratched after being drawn to play the Old Harrovians. There are very few records of any matches for the club, and its other recorded competitive fixtures were in the much lower-key East End Junior Cup or the Essex County Challenge Cup; as it did not enter the London Senior Cup, it is possible the club entered the FA Cup instead of it by mistake.

References 

James
James
1882 establishments in England
1966 disestablishments in England
19th-century Church of England church buildings